The Gay-Lussac–Humboldt Prize is German–French science prize. It was created in 1981 by French President Valéry Giscard d'Estaing and German Chancellor Helmut Schmidt based on the recommendation of the German and French research ministries. The prize money is €60,000.

The prize is awarded to researchers that have made outstanding contributions in science, especially in cooperation between the two countries. Four to five German and French scientists from all research disciplines are honored with this award every year. The prize was originally named after Alexander von Humboldt and carries since 1997 the double name Gay-Lussac–Humboldt.
The Gay-Lussac-Humboldt Award is granted by the French Ministry of Higher Education and Research to German researchers nominated by French researchers. On the other hand, it is awarded by the Alexander von Humboldt Foundation to French researchers nominated by German scientists.

Prize winners

References

Sources 
 Gay-Lussac–Humboldt Prize (PDF, in French)
 Laureates 1983–2010 (PDF, in French)
 2012 Laureates (PDF, in French)
 2013 Laureates (in French)
 2014 Laureates (in French)
 2015 Laureates (in French)
 2016 Laureates (in French)

Science and technology awards
Alexander von Humboldt
Valéry Giscard d'Estaing